Giuseppe De Fabris (1790 — 1860) was an Italian sculptor of the Neoclassic style.

Biography
He was born in Nove in the province of Vicenza. His father was a director of a factory of ceramic decoration. He moved to Rome as a young man, and was patronized by Pope Gregory XVI. He was named director of the musei pontifici.

Among his major works in Rome are:
Monuments and busts in the Sala Maggiore, Protomoteca Capitolina
Monument to Francesco Guglielmi, church of Santi Ambrogio e Carlo al Corso 
Monument to Prassede Tomati Robilant, church of Sant'Andrea della Valle
Monument to cardinal Francesco Fontana, church of Santi Biagio and Carlo ai Catinari 
Monument to Cardinal Placido Zurla, church of San Gregorio al Celio
Busto di Leone XII, church of Santa Maria in Cosmedin 
Monument to Antonio Maria Traversi, Basilica of Santa Maria Maggiore
Monument to Torquato Tasso, church of Sant'Onofrio
Monument to Giuseppe Vitelli, church of San Rocco all'Augusteo
Bust of Pope Leo XII, Cloister of San Cosimato
Bust of Raphael; Self-portrait; Bust of Pope Gregory XVI, Pantheon, Congregazione dei Virtuosi

Sources

19th-century Italian sculptors
Italian male sculptors
Neoclassical sculptors
1790 births
1860 deaths
19th-century Italian male artists